Leverton is an unincorporated community in Linn County, in the U.S. state of Missouri.

History
A post office called Leverton was established in 1883, and remained in operation until 1901. Leverton Wilcox, an early postmaster, gave the community his first name.

References

Unincorporated communities in Linn County, Missouri
Unincorporated communities in Missouri